Ingrid Kirsten Wells (born March 29, 1989) is an American professional soccer player from Montclair, New Jersey. Nicknamed "the Little General", Wells was a midfielder for the Georgetown Hoyas women's soccer team as well as various levels of the USWNT. She previously played in the National Women's Soccer League (NWSL) for the Western New York Flash and Washington Spirit, Sweden's Göteborg FC in the Damallsvenskan, 1. FFC Turbine Potsdam in the German Frauen-Bundesliga, and was captain of the United States U-23 women's national soccer team from 2010 to 2012. She retired from her soccer career to pursue a career in public health nutrition at the end of the 2015 season.

Early life
Wells attended Montclair High School for all four years of her high school career. She was captain of the Mounties' varsity squad during her junior and senior years. Wells helped the Montclair Mounties win the Essex County Championships in 2007. She was the New Jersey Gatorade Player of the Year and the Star Ledger Player of the Year in 2007. Wells was regarded as one of the top 50 incoming freshman in the nation by SoccerBuzz. The 2006–07 New Jersey Gatorade Player of the Year is a past member of the U.S. National Pool, a three-time Region One ODP team member and a member of the N.J. ODP Program. An NSCAA All-American, Wells enjoyed an exceptional career at Montclair High School where she was named New Jersey Star Ledger High School Player of the Year and First Team All-State. Wells was also a member of the U18 Parsippany Gazelles, a very successful club team program, and one of the leading teams on the East Coast.

College career
During her first year at Georgetown, in which she started every game, Wells scored six goals and dished out 13 assists, tying Georgetown's single-season record for assists. Wells also earned many accolades such as being the BIG EAST Rookie of the Year, First Team All-BIG EAST, NSCAA/Adidas National All-American, Regional All-American, SoccerBuzz Magazine National All-American, National Freshman All-American, Regional All-American and Regional Rookie of the Year.

In 2008, Wells redshirted her sophomore year to play for the United States U-20 women's national soccer team in the 2008 FIFA U-20 Women's World Cup. By the end of the 2009 season, Wells was ranked second all-time in assists (24) for the Hoyas. She had also been named to the Preseason M.A.C Hermann Trophy Watch List. During her sophomore year for the Hoyas, Wells started all 20 games and once again earned many accolades such as an All-BIG EAST First Team selection, named an Honorable Mention All-American by TopDrawerSoccer.com, selected to the BIG EAST Academic Honor Roll, and was an ECAC Division I Women's Soccer All-Star. She was ranked first in the BIG EAST with 11 assists and was third in the league with 25 points, and fourth in the league with 1.25 points per game.  Her point total matched her output from her freshman campaign in 2007, which was one point shy of the school single-season record. By the end of the season she ranked second all-time in assists (24) and eighth all-time in points (50).

In her third year for the Hoyas, Wells once again started in all 24 games. She earned the honors of being the BIG EAST Midfielder of the Year, an All-BIG EAST First Team selection for the third time in her career, an NSCAA All-Northeast Region First Team selection, a First Team All-American by the National Soccer Coaches Association of America, a BIG EAST Academic All-Star, and was named one of 15 finalists for the Missouri Athletic Club's Hermann Trophy, recognizing the top player in college soccer. She trained during the second half of the year with the United States Under-23 National Team. Wells led the Hoyas into the 2010 College Cup; Georgetown was knocked out by Ohio State in the quarterfinals. Georgetown head coach Dave Nolan remarked, "I thought Ingrid was tremendous tonight, she was the best player on the field, [but to win] you probably need to have eight or nine of your players show up and have great games, and I don't think we got that."

Following her red shirt senior season, Wells went directly to train with the United States women's national soccer team before moving to Sweden to play professionally. During her time at Georgetown, she became the first soccer player (woman or man) at Georgetown to score 100 points during their career.

Professional career

Club

Göteborg FC, 2012
During the 2012 season, Wells played for the Swedish club Göteborg FC in the Damallsvenskan. She made 19 appearances with nine starts for the club for a total of 862 minutes. The team won the Svenska Cupen Women and was runner-up at the Super Cup Women.

NWSL: Washington Spirit and Western New York Flash, 2013
In 2013, Wells signed with the Washington Spirit for the inaugural season of the NWSL. Of the signing, Wells said, "It's an honor to get the opportunity to play for the Spirit. I'm excited to be playing in DC again as it is a strong soccer community and am really looking forward to the start of the season!" Wells made eight appearances and starts for the club playing a total of 549 minutes. On June 20, 2013, it was announced that she had been waived by the Spirit, after informing the team of her intention to sign with a Frauen-Bundesliga club for the following season, in accordance with league rules. She later signed with the Western New York Flash who won the regular league title and were runners-up for the inaugural NWSL championship title. Wells made ten appearances for the Flash.

1. FFC Turbine Potsdam, 2013 
Wells joined German Frauen-Bundesliga club 1. FFC Turbine Potsdam in August 2013.

International
Wells was a member of the United States U-20 women's national soccer team, which won the 2008 FIFA U-20 Women's World Cup in Chile. She played in five matches, starting in four which included the final match where the United States defeated North Korea, 2–1.

Wells was also a regular with the United States U-23 women's national soccer team and USWNT. She retired from soccer to pursue a career in nutrition at the end of the 2015 season, enrolling in NYU's College of Global Public Health's Master Public Health nutrition program, and gained her master's degree two years later.

Honors

Individual 

2011 NSCAA/Adidas National All-American - 1st Team
2010 NSCAA/Adidas National All-American - 1st Team
2007 NSCAA/Adidas National All-American - 2nd Team
2011 BIG EAST Midfielder of the Year
2010 BIG EAST Midfielder of the Year
2007, 2009, 2010, 2011 First Team All-BIG EAST
2007 BIG EAST Rookie of the Year
2007 SoccerBuzz Magazine National All-American
2007 National Freshman All-American
2007 Regional All-American and Regional Rookie of the Year
2009 ECAC Division I Women's Soccer All-Star  
2009 BIG EAST Academic Honor Roll
2011, 2010 Missouri Athletic Club's Hermann Trophy finalist
2006-07 New Jersey Gatorade Player of the Year

References

External links
 
 Washington Spirit player profile 
 Western New York Flash player profile 
 Georgetown player profile
 

American women's soccer players
1989 births
Living people
Georgetown Hoyas women's soccer players
Washington Spirit players
Expatriate women's footballers in Sweden
American expatriate soccer players in Germany
National Women's Soccer League players
Western New York Flash players
BK Häcken FF players
Damallsvenskan players
1. FFC Turbine Potsdam players
Frauen-Bundesliga players
Soccer players from New Jersey
Soccer players from New York City
Women's association football midfielders
United States women's under-20 international soccer players
Montclair High School (New Jersey) alumni
People from Montclair, New Jersey
Sportspeople from Essex County, New Jersey
American expatriate women's soccer players